The Weakness of Man is a lost 1916 silent film drama directed by Barry O'Neil. It stars Holbrook Blinn and is based on the 1911 play The Living Corpse by Leo Tolstoy. It was produced by William A. Brady and distributed by World Film Company.

Cast
Holbrook Blinn - David Spencer
Eleanor Woodruff - Janice Lane
Richard Wangermann - John Spencer
Charles Mackay - Dr. Stone
Alma Hanlon - Babbie Norris
Walter Greene - Bert Rollins (*as Walter D. Greene)
Teddy Sampson - Estelle
Johnny Hines - Sam Perkins (*as John Hines)

References

External links
The Weakness of Man at IMDb.com

1916 films
American silent feature films
Lost American films
World Film Company films
Silent American drama films
1916 drama films
American black-and-white films
1916 lost films
Lost drama films
Films directed by Barry O'Neil
Films based on works by Leo Tolstoy
1910s American films